The 1985 World Series was the championship series of Major League Baseball's (MLB) 1985 season. The 82nd edition of the World Series, it was a best-of-seven playoff played between the American League (AL) champion Kansas City Royals and the National League (NL) champion St. Louis Cardinals. The Royals upset the heavily favored Cardinals in seven games. The Series was popularly known as the "Show-Me Series" or the "I-70 Showdown Series," as both cities are in the state of Missouri which is nicknamed the "Show Me State" and are connected by Interstate 70.

The Cardinals won the NL East division by three games over the New York Mets, then defeated the Los Angeles Dodgers four games to two in the NL Championship Series. The Royals won the AL West division by one game over the California Angels, then defeated the Toronto Blue Jays four games to three in the AL Championship Series. 

The Cardinals were seeking to win their NL-leading 10th World Series title, while the Royals were seeking their first World Series title. The Royals were completing one of the most successful decades by any expansion team, with six division titles and two pennants from 1976 to 1985. This was the first World Series in which all games were played at night.

This is the most recent World Series in which the designated hitter was not used in an AL baseball park. From  to 1985, the DH was used in all games in even-numbered years. In odd-numbered years, like this World Series, the pitchers from both were required to bat for themselves throughout the series, as in the National League. Beginning with the next World Series, the DH rule was used only at the AL representative's park.

The 1985 World Series marked the fifth time in World Series history that a team came back from a three games to one deficit to win a championship, and the first in which that team lost the first two games of the series at home (in the following year's Series, the New York Mets won after losing the first two series games at home). Bret Saberhagen's victories in Games 3 and 7, allowing only a single run in both starts, earned him the World Series Most Valuable Player Award.

In their 17th season, the Royals won their first World Series title; their next appearance was 29 years later in  against the San Francisco Giants, but lost in seven games. A year later, the Royals won their second title, over the New York Mets.

Summary

Matchups

Game 1

When Lonnie Smith led off for the Royals, he became the first player in MLB history to be traded from a team (the St. Louis Cardinals) during a season and play against that team in the World Series the same season.

John Tudor scattered seven hits in  innings for the Cards and won with relief help from Todd Worrell. The Royals struck first in the second on Steve Balboni's RBI single with runners on first and second, but the Cardinals tied it off of Danny Jackson in the third on Willie McGee's RBI groundout with runners on second and third. Next inning, Tito Landrum doubled with one out, then scored on late-season acquisition César Cedeño's RBI double to give Jackson the loss despite Jackson throwing seven innings of two-run ball. The Cardinals padded their lead in the ninth off of Dan Quisenberry when Tom Herr singled to lead off and scored on Jack Clark's double.

This was the first Saturday night game in World Series history. The Series began on a Saturday from 1969 through 1976, and again from 1985 through 2006 (with the exception of 1990, which began on a Tuesday night).

Game 2

The Royals went up 2–0 in the fourth off of Danny Cox when Willie Wilson hit a leadoff single that was followed by back-to-back RBI doubles by George Brett and Frank White. However Charlie Leibrandt continued a history of tough luck in the postseason. The previous year, he had lost Game 3 of the 1984 ALCS, 1–0, to the Detroit Tigers when he pitched a three-hit complete game. He lost Game 4 in the 1985 ALCS in the ninth inning. Clinging to a two-run lead in the ninth of this game, manager Dick Howser opted to not send in his relief ace Dan Quisenberry to close out the game. Leibrandt allowed a leadoff double to Willie McGee, then was only one out from tying the series at one apiece when he allowed an RBI single to Jack Clark. After a double and walk loaded the bases, Terry Pendleton cleared them with a double and gave the Cardinals a 4–2 lead. Quisenberry came in and after he walked Darrell Porter he got out of the inning. Jeff Lahti earned a save with a scoreless bottom of the inning. The Cardinals' four run ninth would be the only inning in the series in which they scored more than one run.

Game 3

The Royals got back into the series by riding ace Bret Saberhagen to a 6–1 victory against twenty-game winner Joaquín Andújar. Saberhagen flashed messages on the television screen to his pregnant wife who was due to give birth any day. She eventually gave birth on October 26 (in Game 6). The Royals went up 2–0 in the fourth on Lonnie Smith's two-run double that scored Jim Sundberg and Buddy Biancalana, who had walked and singled, respectively. Royals second baseman Frank White made history by becoming the first second baseman in the history of the World Series to hit in the clean-up spot in the batting order. White came through with a two-run home run off of Andújar in the fifth after George Brett got on base. The Cardinals scored their only run of the game in the sixth off of Bret Saberhagen on consecutive singles by Ozzie Smith, Tom Herr, and Jack Clark. The Royals padded their lead in the seventh off of Ricky Horton when George Brett drew a leadoff walk, moved to second on a balk, then scored on White's double. Two outs later, White scored on Buddy Biancalana's single to cap the scoring.

Game 4

John Tudor's complete game shutout put the Cardinals on the verge of winning their second World Series in four years. Tito Landrum, only playing due to a tarp injury to Vince Coleman, continued to make his case for series MVP with a home run in the second off of Bud Black. Next inning, Willie McGee homered also to make it 2–0 Cardinals, who added to their lead in the fifth when Terry Pendleton tripled with one out and scored on Black's throwing error on Tom Nieto's bunt attempt. The best chance for the Royals to score was in the seventh inning, when they loaded the bases on two singles and a walk. With pinch-hitter Hal McRae up for Buddy Biancalana, he grounded to the third baseman to end the threat. Tudor allowed just five hits in a complete game while striking out eight with one walk while Black went just five innings and allowing three runs on four hits and three walks.

Game 5

Entering this game, the Royals were 3–0 in must-win games in playoff elimination games. They improved their record to 4–0 with a decisive victory over the Cardinals, again by the score of 6–1. The Royals struck first on Frank White's groundout with runners on second and third in the top of the first off of Bob Forsch, but the Cardinals tied it off of Danny Jackson in the bottom half on back-to-back two-out doubles by Tom Herr and Jack Clark. However, they would not score after that. The Royals broke the game open in the second when Buddy Biancalana singled to score Jim Sundberg, who doubled with one out. After Lonnie Smith walked, Willie Wilson tripled home both runs to make it 4–1. The Royals added to their lead in the eighth off of Jeff Lahti on shortstop Ozzie Smith's throwing error on Danny Jackson's ground ball, then in the ninth on Pat Sheridan's RBI double. Jackson was the winning pitcher, following the same formula and pitching rotation as the Royals did in the ALCS where Jackson also won Game 5. Jackson threw an immaculate inning in the 7th, becoming the only pitcher to do so during a World Series game to date. Jackson scattered five hits, allowing only one run in a complete game.

Game 6

A pitcher's duel unfolded between Danny Cox and Charlie Leibrandt, the tough-luck loser in Game 2. The game was marked by controversy. In the fourth inning of the scoreless game, the Royals' Frank White appeared to have stolen second base, but was ruled out in a questionable call. The batter, Pat Sheridan, hit a single to right field two pitches later. This would have likely given the Royals a 1–0 lead had White been called safe. Instead, Leibrandt and Cox traded scoreless innings until the eighth, when pinch-hitter Brian Harper singled home Terry Pendleton, who had singled earlier, to give the Cardinals a 1–0 lead.

The Cardinals' 1–0 lead entering the bottom of the eighth was the result of St. Louis taking the upper hand after two situations that were mirror images of each other: In consecutive half-innings – the bottom of the seventh and the top of the eighth – both teams had runners on first and second with their respective starting pitcher coming to bat. Kansas City manager Dick Howser opted to leave Leibrandt in the game to bat, but the Royals starter struck out to end the inning. In contrast, Whitey Herzog pulled Cardinals starter Cox for pinch hitter Harper, who then had the game's first hit with runners in scoring position to put St. Louis ahead 1–0.

In the bottom of the ninth, Herzog called on rookie reliever Todd Worrell to relieve setup man Ken Dayley, who had pitched the eighth and would have been the winner had the Cardinals won. The first batter, pinch-hitter Jorge Orta, sent a chopping bouncer to the right of Jack Clark. He tossed the ball to Worrell, who tagged the bag ahead of Orta, but Clark's toss was behind Worrell and it allowed the running Orta to come between umpire Don Denkinger and his view of the lunging Worrell's glove. Denkinger called Orta safe. TV replays  - not used by officials for play review until 2008 - indicated that Orta should have been called out, and an argument ensued on the field. The Cardinals argued briefly but as crew chief and believing he had made the correct call, Denkinger would not reverse it. Orta remained at first. In his book You're Missing a Great Game, Herzog wrote that he later wished he had asked Commissioner Peter Ueberroth, who was in attendance, to overrule the call and declare Orta out. If Ueberroth had refused to do so, Herzog would have pulled his team from the field and forfeited the game.

Instead of one out and no one on, the Royals now had no outs and a runner on first for batter Steve Balboni. Balboni lifted a pop-up in foul territory along the edge of the first base dugout. Jack Clark, who had only recently made the transition from right field to first base that season, lost track of the ball as he looked to find the dugout and the ball dropped on the top step of the dugout. Balboni then singled two pitches later, putting runners at first and second with nobody out. Onix Concepción was sent in as a pinch-runner for the slow-footed Balboni. Catcher Jim Sundberg attempted to sacrifice the runners over, but he failed. With two strikes, he bunted anyway, and sent it back to Worrell, who threw to third to force out Orta, the only out the Cardinals would record. Porter then allowed a passed ball allowing Concepción and Sundberg to advance to third and second, respectively.

With first base now open and two runners in scoring position, Herzog then chose to walk Royals pinch-hitter Hal McRae to set up a potential double-play. McRae would be replaced by the faster John Wathan to pinch-run to avoid a potential double play. With the bases loaded and one out, Royals pinch-hitter Dane Iorg (a former Cardinal who had won a championship ring with them in 1982) blooped a single to right field. Pinch runner Onix Concepción scored the tying run and Sundberg approached the plate with the winning run. Right fielder Andy Van Slyke's throw was on target, but Sundberg slid home safely with the game-winning run before Porter was able to tag him.

The Royals celebrated the rally, and mobbed home plate. The Cardinals went to their dressing rooms, only to find champagne waiting for them and plastic over their lockers in anticipation for the celebration that never came. Denkinger stated that he still believed he had made the right call until he later met with Commissioner Peter Ueberroth after the game and had the opportunity to see the replay himself. He would later claim that he was waiting to hear the ball land in Worrell's glove while watching the bag for Orta's foot. Due to the crowd noise in Royals Stadium, he ruled Orta safe because he never heard Worrell catch the ball. "I was in good position, but Worrell is tall, the throw was high, and I couldn't watch his glove and his feet at the same time," Denkinger told Sports Illustrated. "It was a soft toss, and there was so much crowd noise, I couldn't hear the ball hit the glove." Denkinger was also scheduled to be the home plate umpire in Game 7.

Game 7

One night after becoming a father, Bret Saberhagen tossed a five-hitter and got all the offense he needed when Darryl Motley homered to left off John Tudor in the second inning, after a walk to Steve Balboni. In the third, Lonnie Smith led off with a walk, and with one out George Brett hit an infield single. After a double steal, Tudor issued walks to Frank White to load the bases and Jim Sundberg to force in Smith, making it 3–0. Tudor was replaced with Bill Campbell after only  innings. Balboni singled to left off Campbell to score Brett and White to make it 5–0. Tudor walked four and was charged with all five runs. In the dugout, he angrily punched an electrical fan, cutting his pitching hand.

The Royals blew the game open in the bottom of the fifth. A succession of five Cardinal pitchers allowed six Royals runs, five coming after two were out. Campbell gave up a single to Sundberg and was immediately replaced by Jeff Lahti, who allowed four runs before being replaced by Ricky Horton. However, after Horton gave up a single to Brett, Herzog immediately replaced him with Joaquín Andújar, normally a starter but pressed into relief. Andújar allowed an RBI single to Frank White to increase the Royals lead to 10–0. With Sundberg at the plate (the Royals had batted around), Andújar twice charged home plate umpire Denkinger to disagree with his strike zone. First, Denkinger called an Andújar pitch a ball. Herzog, who had been berating Denkinger for most of the game, rushed from the dugout to defend Andújar, and was ejected—reportedly after saying to Denkinger, "We wouldn't even be here if you hadn't missed the fucking call last night!" According to Denkinger, he replied "Well if you guys weren't hitting .120 in this World Series, we wouldn't be here." The next pitch was also called a ball, and Denkinger ejected Andújar, who then charged at Denkinger. It took three teammates to restrain him and get him off the field. Andújar was suspended for the first ten games of the 1986 season for his outburst. Although it has been rumored that Herzog sent in Andújar specifically to bait Denkinger, Herzog himself has said several times Andújar was the only pitcher who still had anything left in his arm. After the ejection, Game 5 loser Bob Forsch walked Sundberg (the walk was charged to Andújar), but got out of the fifth-inning nightmare. He pitched a clean sixth inning and Ken Dayley kept the Royals off the scoreboard for the last two innings, but it was not enough as the Cardinals could not score against Saberhagen.

The Royals became the first team ever to win the World Series after losing the first two games at home. The following year, the New York Mets accomplished the same feat by defeating the Boston Red Sox in seven games. In the 1996 World Series, the New York Yankees lost their first two games at home against the defending 1995 World Series champion Atlanta Braves before winning four straight to claim the title. The Royals also were the fifth team in MLB history to come back from a 3–1 deficit to win a best-of-seven World Series, the previous teams being the 1925 Pittsburgh Pirates, 1958 New York Yankees, 1968 Detroit Tigers, and the 1979 Pittsburgh Pirates. The 1985 Royals had also come back from a three games to one deficit to win the American League Championship Series against the Toronto Blue Jays, making them the first and so far only team to do so (the championship series had changed from a best-of-five to a best-of-seven format in 1985). The six elimination games won by the Royals represent a Major League record for a single postseason, a record which would later be equaled by the 2012 San Francisco Giants. The Royals became the first team to win two Game 7s in one postseason. The 2017 Houston Astros are the only other team to achieve this feat.

The Cardinals' .185 batting average was the lowest for a seven-game World Series until the New York Yankees hit .183 in the 2001 World Series against the Arizona Diamondbacks. The Cardinals also scored only thirteen total runs—an all-time low for a seven-game series—scoring only once in the final 26 innings of the series. If they had held on for the win in Game 6, they still would have been outscored in the series 15–13.

The Royals did not play in another postseason game until the 2014 American League Wild Card Game.

This was Kansas City's second major professional sports championship, joining the Chiefs' victory in Super Bowl IV in January 1970. Each franchise has added one championship, the Royals in 2015 and the Chiefs in Super Bowl LIV in February 2020.

Composite box
1985 World Series (4–3): Kansas City Royals (A.L.) over St. Louis Cardinals (N.L.)

Broadcasting
ABC televised the series, with play-by-play announcer Al Michaels and color commentators Jim Palmer and Tim McCarver. This was the first World Series broadcast for McCarver, who would go on to call a record 24 World Series telecasts with ABC, CBS and Fox. Howard Cosell was originally scheduled to be in the booth with Michaels and Palmer, but was removed from his assignment just prior to Game 1 because of the controversy surrounding his book I Never Played the Game.

CBS Radio broadcast the series nationally, with Jack Buck on play-by-play and Sparky Anderson providing color commentary. Locally, Royals' flagship station WIBW aired the games in Kansas City with Denny Matthews and Fred White alternating on play-by-play and color, while in St. Louis the Cardinals' flagship KMOX simulcast the CBS Radio coverage due to Buck's status as the team's primary local announcer during the regular season.

Notes

See also
1985 Japan Series
1985 MLB Postseason

References
 
 Neft, David S., and Richard M. Cohen. The World Series. 1st ed. New York: St Martins, 1990. (Neft and Cohen 407–411)

External links

 K.C. Had A Blast at SI.com
 1985 Kansas City Royals at baseballlibrary.com
 1985 St. Louis Cardinals at baseballlibrary.com

World Series
World Series
Kansas City Royals postseason
St. Louis Cardinals postseason
World Series
20th century in Kansas City, Missouri
1980s in St. Louis
October 1985 sports events in the United States
Baseball competitions in Kansas City, Missouri
Baseball competitions in St. Louis